The 2006–07 season was the 62nd season in the existence of Lille OSC and the club's seventh consecutive season in the top flight of French football. In addition to the domestic league, Lille participated in this season's editions of the Coupe de France, Coupe de la Ligue and UEFA Champions League. The season covered the period from 1 July 2006 to 30 June 2007.

First-team squad
Squad at end of season

Left club during season

Competitions

Overview

Ligue 1

League table

Results summary

Results by round

Coupe de France

Coupe de la Ligue

Champions League

Third qualifying round

Group stage

Knockout phase

Round of 16

Notes and references

Notes

References

Lille OSC
Lille OSC seasons